Malika Amar Sheikh or Malika Namdeo Dhasal (born 16 February 1957) is a Marathi writer and political activist from Maharashtra, India. She is the president of the Dalit Panthers party.

Biography
Malika Amar Sheikh was born on 16 February 1957 to Shahir Amar Sheikh. She married Dalit poet, and co-founder of the Dalit Panthers, Namdev Dhasal.After the death of her husband, she was elected the president of the party and led it during Maharashtra civic bodies elections in 2017.

Books
 Valucha Priyakar (A Lover Made of Sand)
 Mahanagar (Metropolitan City)
 Deharutu (The Season of Body)
 Mala Udhvasta Whaychay (I Want to Get Ruined) (Autobiography)
 Handle With Care
 Ek Hota Undir (Story Of A Rat)
 Koham Koham (Who Am I?)

Anthologies
 Live Update: An Anthology of Recent Marathi Poetry, edited and translated by Sachin Ketkar, Mumbai: Poetrywala, 2005, 
 The Tree of Tongues — An Anthology of Modern Indian Poetry'', edited by E. V. Ramakrishnan. Indian Institute of Advanced Studies, Shimla.

References

1957 births
Living people
20th-century Indian women writers
Marathi-language writers
Women writers from Maharashtra
20th-century Indian novelists
Novelists from Maharashtra
Indian women novelists